Cerithiella danielsseni is a species of very small sea snail, a marine gastropod mollusk in the family Newtoniellidae. It was described by Friele, in 1877.

References

Newtoniellidae
Gastropods described in 1877